Anton Del Castillo (born in 1976 in Tondo, Manila, Philippines) is a multi-awarded and critically acclaimed Filipino visual artist known for the stunning craftsmanship and meticulous design of his artworks that meditate on critiques of modernism and contemporary life. His production of iconic and playful art objects such as sculptures produced in steel and paintings that resemble Byzantine icons, aside from other projects, have earned him recognition not only as an artist but as a master artisan and craftsman.

Del Castillo lives and works in Quezon City in the Philippines. He is currently an assistant professor at the University of the Philippines Integrated School in Diliman, Quezon City, and Assistant Professor I, Artist II, at the University of the Philippines, also in Quezon City.

Del Castillo inaugurated his artistic career by opening his first one-man show at the Cultural Center of the Philippines, Manila, in 2005. He has since then taken part in solo and group exhibitions in Beijing, Hong Kong, New York, Malaysia, Singapore, Tokyo and Manila, while garnering international awards and recognition in the Southeast Asian region and beyond.

Education

Del Castillo received his BFA and MFA degrees from the College of Fine Arts, University of the Philippines in Diliman, Quezon City, the Philippines. He is also a trained art restorer, having undertaken training in the restoration department of the National Museum of the Philippines.

Critical acclaim

Del Castillo has been noted for playing with the themes of war and religion, childhood and lost innocence, and the transformation of meaning through time. In series dealing with warfare in multimedia works and ancient and contemporary icons in gold leaf paintings, his intention has been said "to showcase the similarities of belief towards achieving peace, which is the precedent of war or vice versa." Inspired also by his own childhood memories, Del Castillo, in other series such as his metal works and mixed media toys, also attempts to refashion innocence and playfulness amidst the locus of art and its seriousness, ultimately embracing the act of production itself as the main motive of his art, samples of which have been praised as not only "playful but also powerful." By accomplishing such feats, he has been said to communicate the essence of transformation, technological advancement, and enlightenment by creating culturally informed imagery. Meanwhile, others see his work as symbolic of rigid modernity where "life is a lackluster cycle."

Commercial success

Several works by the artist have been sold at auction, including "Toy Soldier 4" at Salcedo Auctions.

Solo exhibitions of Del Castillo
2003 Mutiny, Cultural Center of the Philippines (CCP), Pasay, Philippines
2005 Under One Roof, Small Gallery, CCP, Manila, Philippines
2007 Crossing Boundaries, Art Space, Makati, PH; Anton del Castillo, International Studio and Curatorial Program, Rm 704, NY, USA
2009 Psych War, Alliance Total Gallery, Makati, Philippines 
2009 Conquistador, NOVA Gallery, Makati, Philippines
2010 Retrospective Play, Outerspace Gallery, The Collective, Makati, Philippines
2011 Unwanted Fate: New Works by Anton del Castillo, Altro Mondo Arte Contemporanea Gallerie, Makati, Philippines
2012 In the Landscape of Having to Repeat, Altro Mondo Arte Contemporanea Gallerie, The Picasso Boutique Serviced Residences, Makati, Philippines
2012 Tribulation, Now Gallery, Makati, Philippines
2012 Iconodulum, Now Gallery, Makati, Philippines
2013 Traffic Signs, Now Gallery, Makati, Philippines
2013 BUENVIAJE: An Ode to Good Voyage, UP Vargas Museum 
2013 Absence, Canvas Gallery and Garden, Quezon City, Philippines
2014 Anatomy to Flight, Altro Mondo Arte Contemporanea Gallerie, The Picasso Boutique Serviced Residences, Makati, Philippines

Group exhibitions
2000 Resurrecting the Past, National Museum of the Philippines, Manila, Philippines
2003 One by One, Ayala Museum, Makati, Philippines
2004 First Exhibition of International Art Expo Korea, Seoul, South Korea 
2007 Outbound, Ateneo Art Awards, Makati, Philippines
2007 A Question of Perspective, Asian Cultural Council, The Lee Gardens, Hong Kong, China
2007 The Most Curatorial Biennal of the Universe, Apexart Gallery, New York, United States
2008 Art Beijing, Beijing, China
2008 Up in monochromes, UNESCO Salle de pas Perdu, Paris, France
2009 LARASATI, HT Contemporary Art Space, Singapore
2009 Cultural Warfare, Big and Small Gallery, Makati, Philippines
2011 Topak, All in the Mind, UP Vargas Museum, Quezon City, Philippines
2011 Flowershow: Contemporary Takes on the Floral, Krem Contemporary Art, Quezon City, Philippines  
2014 Design Insights Philippines, Yuchengco Museum, Makati, Philippines  
2014 A Child's Memory, Ateneo Art Gallery, Quezon City, Philippines
2014 PIGS Politics, Immortality, Gods and Society, Helutrans Artspace, Singapore

Recognition and fellowships
1995 Finalist, oil category, 28th Shell National Students Art Competition
1997 Finalist, oil category, Shell National Students Art Competition, Manila 
1999 Finalist, Winton and Newton Millennium International Art Competition, Museo ng Maynila 
1999 Semi-finalist, oil category, Metrobank Foundation Young Painters Annual Art Competition 
2002 Semi-finalist, oil category, Metrobank Foundation Young Painters Annual Art Competition 
2002 Special Prize, 7th Letras Y Figuras National Painting Competition, Metropolitan Museum, Manila
2003 Honorable mention, mixed media category, 56th Art Association of the Philippines Competition
2003 Grand Prize, oil category, Metrobank Young Painters Painting Annual Art Competition 
2003 1st place, oil category, Metrobank Young Painters Painting Annual Art Competition 
2004 1st place, 1st Filipino Youth Cultural Expo Painting Competition, Manila
2005 Alternate Freeman Fellowship Grant, Vermont Studio Center, United States
2006 Short-listed, Rijksakademie van Beeldende Kunsten, Amsterdam, Netherlands
2006 Semi-finalist, Beppu Asia Biennial of Contemporary Art, Beppu Art Museum, Beppu, Oita, Japan
2006 Short-listed, Ateneo Arts Award for the exhibition Under One Roof
2006 ACC Fellowship residency, ISCP 
2006 Grantee, Sovereign Foundation Hong Kong Fellowship Grant 
2006 Finalist, Philip Morris Philippines Arts Award, 2006 National Painting Competition 
2006 Grantee, Asian Cultural Council Grant, International Studio and Curatorial Program, New York City, United States
2011 Finalist, Tanaw Bangko Sentral ng Pilipinas National Art Competition, Manila, Philippines 
2011 Schoeni Prize, Sovereign Asian Art Competition, Hong Kong, China
2012 Finalist, Oita Asian Sculpture Competition, Ōita, Japan
2012 Finalist, Oita Asian Sculpture Competition, Ōita, Japan
2012 Finalist, Oita Asian Sculpture Competition, Ōita, Japan
2014 Artist II rank, Arts Productivity System Award, University of the Philippines, Diliman 
2014 Finalist, Oita Asian Sculpture Competition, Ōita, Japan
2014 Metrobank Foundation Award for Continuing Excellence and Service (ACES)
2014 Jurors Choice, Metro Manila Winner, Philip Morris Philippines Arts Award, Manila
2014 Schoeni Prize, Sovereign Asian Art Competition, Hong Kong, China

References

Sources
Flores, Patrick. "Motifs of War", Nova Gallery catalogue.
Jalbuena, Samito. "The game theory of Anton del Castillo", BusinessMirror, December 2, 2014.
Jalbuena, Samito. "Portraits for the end of the world", BusinessMirror, January 27, 2015.

External links
Official website
Altromondo Gallerie artist profile
Now Gallery artist profile
ArtNet profile
Artsy profile

1976 births
Living people
Filipino painters
Filipino sculptors
People from Tondo, Manila
Artists from Metro Manila
University of the Philippines Diliman alumni